Amphipyra sergei is a moth in the family Noctuidae. It is found in Russia, Kazakhstan and China.

External links
Images

Amphipyrinae
Moths of Asia
Moths described in 1888